The Stark Building, known until 2018 as The Hartford Trust Company Building, is a 1920 skyscraper located in downtown Hartford, Connecticut.

History 
The Hartford Trust Company Building, now known as The Stark Building, was built across from the Old State House in downtown Hartford, CT, and is an example of 1920s Colonial Revival skyscrapers. Incorporating the architectural style based on the classical column, the detailing is meant to link the building stylistically to the Old State House.

The building was designed by the firm of Morris & O’Connor and built in 1920. Led by the architect, Benjamin Wistar Morris, the building is listed in the National Register of Historic Places as part of the Main Street Historic District.

The lobby entrance has brass, glass, wood, and marble floors, and a large walk-in safe in the basement remains as a testament to the history of the building. The building was also the location for the World's first pay telephone – a marker appears on the building as designation.

In 1998 the building was purchased by Boxer Properties of Houston for $1.5 million, and in 2017 the building was acquired by Stark Office Suites for $4.3 million. It was renamed The Stark Building in November 2018.

References

External links 
 Stark Office Suites
 Historic building listing
 Historical marker

1920 establishments in Connecticut
National Register of Historic Places in Hartford, Connecticut
History of the telephone